Major General Francis Henry Norman Davidson  (1 April 1892 – 15 January 1973) was a British Army officer who served as the Director of Military Intelligence for much of the Second World War.

Military career
Born on 1 April 1892, Francis Davidson was educated at Marlborough College and the Royal Military Academy, Woolwich. From Woolwich he was commissioned as a second lieutenant into the Royal Artillery on 23 December 1911. He saw active service in the First World War, during which he was wounded, mentioned in despatches four times, and was awarded the Military Cross and Bar. He was also made a Companion of the Distinguished Service Order.

Attending the Staff College, Quetta, between 1925 and 1927 he worked at the Headquarters of the British Indian Army and was brigade major of the 12th Indian Infantry Brigade from 1927 to 1929. He was promoted to major in 1929, lieutenant colonel in 1933 and colonel in 1938. He worked at the War Office from 1930 to 1934, before attending a course at the Imperial Defence College from 1935 to 1936. Between 1937 and 1938 he was an instructor at the Staff College, Camberley.

At the start of the Second World War in September 1939, Davidson was serving, as he had been since January 1938, as the GSO1 of the 2nd Infantry Division, initially under Major General Henry Maitland Wilson until he was succeeded in June 1939 by Major General Charles Loyd, based at Aldershot. He was Commander, Royal Artillery (CRA) of I Corps between 1939 and 1940 as part of the British Expeditionary Force (BEF), then in France. He briefly served as the acting commander of the 2nd Division in 1940 and, after serving as Brigadier General Staff (BGS) of X Corps from June 1940, he was promoted to acting major general on 16 December 1940. That same year he became the Director of Military Intelligence, a position he held until 1944. He was subsequently on the British Army Staff in Washington, D.C. until his retirement from the regular army in 1946. He was made a Commander of the Legion of Merit in 1948.

Between 1952 and 1960 he served as the Colonel Commandant of the Intelligence Corps. He spent his final years in Chelsea, London, where he died on 15 January 1973, at the age of 80.

References

Bibliography

External links
British Army Officers 1939−1945
Generals of World War II

 

1892 births
1973 deaths
Graduates of the Royal College of Defence Studies
British Army generals of World War II
British Army personnel of World War I
Commanders of the Legion of Merit
Companions of the Distinguished Service Order
Companions of the Order of the Bath
Foreign recipients of the Legion of Merit
Graduates of the Royal Military Academy, Woolwich
Graduates of the Staff College, Quetta
People educated at Marlborough College
Recipients of the Czechoslovak War Cross
Recipients of the Military Cross
Recipients of the Order of Polonia Restituta
Recipients of the Order of the White Lion
Recipients of the War Cross (Greece)
Royal Artillery officers
War Office personnel in World War II
British Army major generals
Academics of the Staff College, Camberley